Sugarcreek Township is one of the twelve townships of Greene County, Ohio, United States. As of the 2010 census, the population was 8,041, up from 6,629 people at the 2000 census.

Geography
Located in the southwestern corner of the county, it borders the following townships and city:
Beavercreek Township - north
Spring Valley Township - east
Wayne Township, Warren County - south
Washington Township, Montgomery County - west
Kettering - northwest

Three cities are located in Sugarcreek Township: Bellbrook in the west, a small part of Centerville in the west-northwest, and small part of Kettering in the northwest.

Name and history
Sugarcreek Township was established in 1803. The township was named for its Sugar Creek, a tributary of the Little Miami River. It is the only Sugarcreek Township statewide, although there are five Sugar Creek Townships.

Government
The township is governed by a three-member board of trustees, who are elected in November of odd-numbered years to a four-year term beginning on the following January 1. Two are elected in the year after the presidential election and one is elected in the year before it. There is also an elected township fiscal officer, who serves a four-year term beginning on April 1 of the year after the election, which is held in November of the year before the presidential election. Vacancies in the fiscal officership or on the board of trustees are filled by the remaining trustees.

The township has a police department.

Notable resident
 Brock Turner, convicted rapist

References

External links
Sugarcreek Township official website

Townships in Greene County, Ohio
Townships in Ohio
1803 establishments in Ohio